James Adityavarman Graham (born 10th March 1970 in Canberra), known professionally as Jamie Aditya, is an Indonesian-Australian video jockey, presenter, actor, radio host, and singer.

Family 
Jamie Aditya is the grandson of Achdiat Karta Mihardja, Indonesia's famous writer and novelist from West Java. His Indonesian mother was the daughter of Achdiat K. Mihardja mrs Ati Asyawati and his father, Stuart Laurence Graham is from Australia and the son of Australian Military Senior officer Stuart Clarence Graham. Jamie was their third child.

Career 
He was a VJ for MTV Asia and MTV Indonesia in the 1990s. In 2000, he was chosen as the best host of Asian TV Awards and was nominated as the best host in 2003. From 2004 until 2005, he became the host of Sync or Swim, produced by Discovery Channel. In 2005, he came back to Jakarta with his wife and son and became a singer. In 2007, he was the judge of Indonesian Idol for the fourth season. He also helped indie band from Bandung, such as Rock N Roll Mafia. He collaborated with Glenn Fredly in the song, "Good Times" on the album Aku Dan Wanita. He worked as a host in Singapore's HOTFM 91.3 radio station in September 2012, from 4 pm to 7.30 pm on weekdays, co-hosting with Charmaine Yee. He left the station that same year after a short stint. He voiced Spook and the mice in the kids TV series, Kitty Is Not a Cat.

Filmography 
 XL, Antara Aku, Kau dan Mak Erot (2008)
 Asmara Dua Diana (2009)
 Kabayan Jadi Milyuner (2010)
”Stateless. ABC Drama 2019
^ Griss. 2018 ( best supporting actor)

External links 
  Wawancara tahun 2006
  Wawancara tahun 2005
  Wawancara tahun 2004

References

Living people
Sundanese people
Indo people
1978 births
Indonesian people of Australian descent
Indonesian people of English descent
Indonesian male actors
21st-century Indonesian male singers
Australian emigrants to Indonesia